is a private women's junior college in Kobe, Hyōgo, Japan, established in 1950.

See also
Kobe Women's University

External links
 Official website 

Educational institutions established in 1950
Private universities and colleges in Japan
Universities and colleges in Hyōgo Prefecture
Japanese junior colleges
1950 establishments in Japan